Trade regulation is a field of law, often bracketed with antitrust (as in the phrase “antitrust and trade regulation law”), including government regulation of unfair methods of competition and unfair or deceptive business acts or practices. Antitrust law is often considered a subset of trade regulation law. Franchise and distribution law, consumer protection law, and advertising law are sometimes considered parts of trade regulation law.

See also
 Cornell University — Supreme Court opinions on trade regulation 
FTC   Consumer Protection Bureau
LexisOne — sources of information about antitrust and trade regulation law 
 Sample of Trade Regulation Talk blog.

References 

Business law
Regulation